Thomas J. Newberry (born December 20, 1962) is a former American football guard who played ten seasons in the National Football League with the Los Angeles Rams for nine years and the Pittsburgh Steelers for one year. He was a starter for the Steelers in Super Bowl XXX. He was a two-time (1988,1989) Pro Bowl and NFL All-Pro offensive guard.

Newberry was named to the Wisconsin Sports Hall of Fame in 2015

1962 births
Living people
Sportspeople from La Crosse, Wisconsin
Sportspeople from Springfield, Massachusetts
American football offensive guards
Wisconsin–La Crosse Eagles football players
Los Angeles Rams players
Pittsburgh Steelers players
National Conference Pro Bowl players
Players of American football from Wisconsin
People from Onalaska, Wisconsin